Pomponio Spreti (1595–1652) was a Roman Catholic prelate who served as Bishop of Cervia (1646–1652).

Biography
Pomponio Spreti was born in Ravenna, Italy in 1595.
On 8 Jan 1646, he was appointed during the papacy of Pope Innocent X as Bishop of Cervia.
On 14 Jan 1646, he was consecrated bishop by Pier Luigi Carafa (seniore), Cardinal-Priest of Santi Silvestro e Martino ai Monti, with Ranuccio Scotti Douglas, Bishop of Borgo San Donnino, and Ascanio Cassiani, Bishop of Andria, serving as co-consecrators. 
He served as Bishop of Cervia until his death on 15 Nov 1652.

While bishop, he was the principal co-consecrator of Giovanni Stefano Donghi, Bishop of Ajaccio.

References

External links and additional sources
 (for Chronology of Bishops) 
 (for Chronology of Bishops) 

17th-century Italian Roman Catholic bishops
Bishops appointed by Pope Innocent X
1595 births
1652 deaths